Abu Osama al-Muhajer; is the leader of the ISIL-YP; On 25 June 2019, Saudi special forces announced that they captured Abu Osama al-Muhajer, on 3 June along with other members including the chief financial officer of the organization.

References

Leaders of Islamic terror groups
Islamic State of Iraq and the Levant members
Islamic State of Iraq and the Levant in Yemen
Salafi jihadists
Yemeni Islamists
Terrorism in Yemen